Proud Flesh may refer to:

 Granulation tissue
 Proud Flesh (film), a 1925 film directed by King Vidor
 "Proud Flesh", an episode of Law & Order: Criminal Intent (season 5)
 Proud Flesh, an album by Matrix (band)
 Proud Flesh, a book of photographs by Sally Mann
 Proud Flesh, a novel by William Humphrey
 Proud Flesh, a verse play by Robert Penn Warren that was the basis for his 1946 novel All the King's Men
 Neoregelia 'Proud Flesh', a cultivar of Neoregelia concentrica